Adelino Hidalgo Menéndez (born 8 March 1963 in Avilés) is a Spanish former middle-distance runner. He represented his country in the 1500 metres at the 1989 World Indoor Championships narrowly missing the final.

International competitions

Personal bests
Outdoor
1500 metres – 3:38.30 (A Coruña 1987)
One mile – 3:59.59 (Barcelona 1988)
2000 metres – 5:05.16 (Seville 1986)
3000 metres – 7:55.62 (Seville 1988)
Indoor
1500 metres – 3:39.95 (Seville 1990)
3000 metres – 7:55.17 (The Hague 1989)

References

All-Athletics profile

1963 births
Living people
Spanish male middle-distance runners
People from Avilés
20th-century Spanish people